Anne Morris may refer to:

 Anne Marie Morris (born 1957), British politician
 Anne Morris (camogie); see All-Ireland Senior Club Camogie Championship 1985
 Annie Morris (born 1978), British artist
 Ann Axtell Morris (1900–1945), American archaeologist, artist, and author
 Ann Orr Morris (1924–1987), American silversmith, goldsmith, and enamelist

See also
 Ann Cody (Ann Cody-Morris; born 1963), American Paralympic athlete
 Ann Maurice (born 1951), interior designer
 Anna Mercedes Morris (born 1978), Hollywood stuntwoman and actress